Kuroshiodaphne is a genus of sea snails, marine gastropod mollusks in the family Raphitomidae.

Species
Species within the genus Kuroshiodaphne include:
Kuroshiodaphne aurea Stahlschmidt, Poppe & Tagaro, 2018
Kuroshiodaphne fuscobalteata Smith E. A., 1879
 Kuroshiodaphne phaeacme Sysoev, 1990
 Kuroshiodaphne saturata Reeve, 1845
Kuroshiodaphne subula Reeve, 1845
Kuroshiodaphne supracancellata Schepman, 1913
Synonyms
 Kuroshiodaphne aureus Stahlschmidt, Poppe & Tagaro, 2018 : synonym of Kuroshiodaphne aurea Stahlschmidt, Poppe & Tagaro, 2018 (incorrect gender ending of specific epithet)

References

 Shuto, T. (1965) Turrid gastropods from the Upper Pleistocene Moeshima shell bed. (Molluscan palaeontology of the Pleistocene Formations in Kyushu-I) Memoirs of the Faculty of Science, Kyushu University, series D, Geology, 16, 143–207, pls. 29–35.
page(s): 192

External links
 
 Worldwide Mollusc Species Data Base: Raphitomidae
 Bouchet, P.; Kantor, Y. I.; Sysoev, A.; Puillandre, N. (2011). A new operational classification of the Conoidea (Gastropoda). Journal of Molluscan Studies. 77(3): 273-308

 
Raphitomidae
Gastropod genera